Green-throated greenbul may refer to:

 Olive-headed greenbul, a species of bird found in south-eastern Africa
 Yellow-throated greenbul, a species of bird found in Tanzania

Birds by common name